Mustapha Moussa (born February 2, 1962, in Oran) is an Algerian former boxer who fought in the light heavyweight division. He won the first-ever Olympic medal for Algeria, winning a bronze at the 1984 Summer Olympics in Los Angeles. He shared the podium with American boxer Evander Holyfield.

Career

Pro career
Moussa turned pro in 1988 and had little success. He lost his pro debut to future titlist Mauro Galvano, as well as his other fight in 1988. He fought once in 1992 and 2004, losing both fights. His career record is 0-4-0.

Olympic results

1st round bye
Defeated Drake Thadzi (Malawi) 5-0
Defeated Tony Wilson (Great Britain) 5-0
Lost to Anton Josipović (Yugoslavia) 0-5

Career 

  Olympic Games 1984 Los Angeles, USA (81 kg )
   CISM Championships - Algiers, Algeria 1982 (81 kg )
  Mediterranean Games Casablanca, Morocco 1983 (81 kg )
  Pan Arab Games Rabat, Morocco 1985 (81 kg )
 All-Africa Games ( Nairobi, Kenya) 1987  (- 81 kg )
Quarter-finals World Cup - Seoul, South Korea 1985  (- 81 kg )

Tournament 
  President's Cup ( Jakarta, Indonesia ) 1981 (75 kg)
  French Open ( Perigueux, France ) 1981 (81 kg )
   Feliks Stamm Memorial ( Warsaw, Poland) 1983 (81 kg )
 Giraldo Cordova Cardin Tournament - Santiago de Cuba 1983 (81 kg )
  24 Fevrier Tournament ( Algiers, Algeria ) 1985 (81 kg )

References

External links
 

1962 births
Living people
Light-heavyweight boxers
Boxers at the 1984 Summer Olympics
Olympic boxers of Algeria
Olympic bronze medalists for Algeria
Olympic medalists in boxing
Medalists at the 1984 Summer Olympics
Sportspeople from Oran
Algerian male boxers
Mediterranean Games gold medalists for Algeria
Competitors at the 1983 Mediterranean Games
African Games silver medalists for Algeria
African Games medalists in boxing
Mediterranean Games medalists in boxing
Competitors at the 1987 All-Africa Games
21st-century Algerian people